Pedro de Uceda (died 1741), was a Spanish Baroque painter. His exact year of birth is not known.

Not much is known about his life. He initially studied under Lucas de Valdes. He painted religious-themed works for church commissions.

References

Year of birth unknown
1741 deaths
18th-century Spanish painters
18th-century Spanish male artists
Spanish male painters